William Spurstowe (Spurstow) (c. 1605–1666) was an English clergyman, theologian, and member of the Westminster Assembly. He was one of the Smectymnuus group of Presbyterian clergy, supplying the final WS (read as UUS) of the acronym.

Life

His father William Spurstow was a mercer in London. The son studied at Emmanuel College, Cambridge.

He became a Fellow of St. Katherine's Hall College, Cambridge in 1638, during the Mastership of Ralph Brownrigg, and succeeded as Master in 1645. At the time it was strongly Puritan in tone, with John Arrowsmith, John Bond, Thomas Goodwin, Andrew Perne and William Strong as other Fellows.

In the late 1630s he was an associate of John Hampden, and in 1638 he became vicar of Great Hampden. Later he was chaplain to Hampden's troops.

He became vicar of Hackney in 1643, and was made Master of his college. He was deprived of the mastership, in 1650.

After the Restoration, he was consulted on the Declaration of Indulgence. He was ejected from his parish of Hackney for nonconformity, in 1662. He remained in Hackney, welcomed Richard Baxter, employed Ezekiel Hopkins, and provided a focus for numerous other ejected ministers. He built six almshouses there, work starting shortly before his death.

Works
 Englands Patterne and Duty in Its Monthly Fasts (1643)
 Englands eminent judgments, caus'd by the abuse of Gods eminent mercies (1644)
 The Magistrate's Dignity and Duty (1653) 

 Death and the Grave No Bar to Believers Happinesse (1656)
 A Crown of Life, the Reward of Faithfulnesse (1662)

Notes

1605 births
1666 deaths
Westminster Divines
Participants in the Savoy Conference
Ejected English ministers of 1662
Masters of St Catharine's College, Cambridge
Alumni of Emmanuel College, Cambridge